Pentrich is a civil parish in the Amber Valley district of Derbyshire, England.  The parish contains eight listed buildings that are recorded in the National Heritage List for England.  Of these, one is listed at Grade I, the highest of the three grades, and the others are at Grade II, the lowest grade.  The parish contains the village of Pentrich and the surrounding countryside, and the listed buildings consist of four farmhouses, two mileposts, a church and a railway signal box.


Key

Buildings

References

Citations

Sources

 

Lists of listed buildings in Derbyshire